Yaohai District is one of four urban districts of the prefecture-level city of Hefei, the capital of Anhui Province, East China. It contains 1 township, 1 town, 10 subdistricts, 1 industrial park, and 1 development zone.

Administrative divisions
Yaohai District is divided to 10 subdistricts, 1 towns, 1 townships and 2 others.
Subdistricts

Towns
Daxing

Townships
Modian Township.

Others
Yaohai Industrial Park
Longgang Development Zone

References

External links
Official government website of Yaohai District 

Hefei
County-level divisions of Anhui